Karin Palme (born 27 December 1977) is a former professional tennis player from Mexico.

Biography
Born in Guadalajara, Palme made her debut for the Mexico Fed Cup team in 1994. She played Fed Cup ever year up until 1999, by which time she was in her second season of college tennis at Arizona State University. In 2000 she earned All-American honors for singles.

After graduating she continued to compete on the professional tour and represent Mexico in international events. She won two medals at the 2002 Central American and Caribbean Games and was a doubles bronze medalist at the 2003 Pan American Games in Santo Domingo.

In 2003 she made a comeback to Fed Cup tennis for a further two ties, finishing her career with appearances in 26 ties, second only to Jessica Fernández.

ITF finals

Singles (1–4)

Doubles (3–3)

References

External links
 
 
 

1977 births
Living people
Mexican female tennis players
Arizona State Sun Devils women's tennis players
Competitors at the 2002 Central American and Caribbean Games
Central American and Caribbean Games silver medalists for Mexico
Central American and Caribbean Games bronze medalists for Mexico
Tennis players at the 2003 Pan American Games
Pan American Games bronze medalists for Mexico
Pan American Games medalists in tennis
Sportspeople from Guadalajara, Jalisco
Central American and Caribbean Games medalists in tennis
Medalists at the 2003 Pan American Games
21st-century Mexican women